Machine Girl (sometimes stylized as machin3gir1) is an American electronic music project created in 2012 by Matt Stephenson in Long Island, New York. In 2015, the project became a duo, with Stephenson recruiting percussionist Sean Kelly to play live drums.

Style and themes 
In an interview with Revolver magazine, Stephenson defined Machine Girl as "fucked-up electronic punk" and stated that they didn't like the "industrial" tag for being "very goth, and very black and white" considering the project "a lot more colorful". Kerrang! listed them as one of the "bands expanding the definition of hardcore", and described the project as "a particularly punky and ferocious breed of the electronic sub-genre breakcore that could easily pass for hardcore when they rip it live". Pitchfork defined their style as "relentlessly smashing together bits of punk, grindcore, rave, industrial, and more" and "unpredictable and dangerous, full of animalistic rage and uncontrollable energy".  

The project is named after the 2008 Japanese film The Machine Girl, which they occasionally sampled on their 2014 album WLFGRL.

Members 
 Matt Stephenson – production, vocals (2012–present)
 Sean Kelly – drums (2015–present)

Discography

Studio Albums
WLFGRL (2014)
Gemini (2015)
...Because I'm Young Arrogant and Hate Everything You Stand For (2017)
The Ugly Art (2018)
U-Void Synthesizer (2020)

Extended plays
Electronic Gimp Music EP (2013)
13th Hour EP (2013)
GRLPWR EP (2013)
MACHINE GIRL VS MACHINE GIRL (2016)

Compilations 
 Jet Set Radio Remixes 1 (2014)
 WLFGRL Remixes A (2014)
 WLFGRL Remixes B (2014)
 Phantom Tracks (2015)
 Phantasy Trax™ (2016)
 WLFGRL+ (2017)
 MG DEMO DISC (2020)
 RePorpoised Phantasies (2020)
 Stretch Collection (2020)

Singles 

 "Gravity Diva" (2012)
 "Emerald Juke / Krystle (Glitch Mix)" (2014)
 "Killing of the Bird / Lifeforce" (2015)
 "Costume / Fuqthatlil" (2016)
 "Minnesota / Explode" (2016)

Split and Collaborative Releases
Darren Keen + Machine Girl (2014)
Machine Girl / Five Star Hotel (2016)
Shade / Machine Girl - QUARANTINETAPES_vol3 (2020)

Mix Compilations
MRK90 Mix Vol. 1 (2018)

Soundtracks 

 Neon White OST 1 - The Wicked Heart (2022)
 Neon White OST 2 - The Burn That Cures (2022)

External links
Official website
Machine Girl at Bandcamp
Machine Girl at Facebook
Machine Girl discography at MusicBrainz
Machine Girl discography at Discogs

References 

Electronic music groups
Electronic music groups from New York (state)
Musical groups from Long Island
Digital hardcore music groups
Drum and bass music groups
Musical groups established in 2013
2013 establishments in New York (state)
Electronic music duos